Country Junkie is the sixth studio album by Canadian country music artist Gord Bamford. It was released on October 8, 2013 by Cache/Sony Music Canada. Bamford premiered the first single, "When Your Lips Are So Close", at the Canadian Country Music Association Awards in September 2013.

Country Junkie was nominated for Country Album of the Year at the 2014 Juno Awards.

Critical reception
Dustin Blumhagen of Country Standard Time gave the album a positive review, writing that "there are plenty of funny songs and party songs, but Bamford excels when he uses his voice to channel emotion into love ballads." Shenieka Russell-Metcalf of Top Country gave the album four and a half stars out of five, saying that it "gives us a good mix of catchy songs […] and songs that hit close to our hearts."

Track listing

Chart performance

Album

Singles

References

2013 albums
Gord Bamford albums
Sony Music Canada albums
Albums produced by Byron Hill